Dedi Heryanto (born 25 November 1988) is an Indonesian professional footballer who currently plays as a goalkeeper for Persijap Jepara in the Indonesia Super League.

Career

Persijap Jepara
He moved from Persikabo Bogor to Persijap Jepara in January 2014.

External links
 
 Player profil at goal.com

1988 births
Living people
Indonesian footballers
Liga 1 (Indonesia) players
Persijap Jepara players
Persikabo Bogor players
Association football goalkeepers